Master of the House (literally Thou Shalt Honour Thy Wife) is a 1925 Danish silent drama film directed and written by acclaimed filmmaker Carl Theodor Dreyer. The film marked the debut of Karin Nellemose, and it is regarded by many as a classic of Danish cinema.

Plot
Viktor Frandsen, embittered by losing his business, is a tyrant at home, constantly criticizes his patient, hard-working wife Ida and their three children. He does not appreciate the effort it takes to maintain a household. While his wife is resigned and browbeaten, his old nanny, nicknamed Mads by all, openly defends her. When Mrs. Kryger, Ida's mother, pays a visit, he is rude to her. Finally, he issues an ultimatum: either Mrs. Kryger and the openly hostile Mads (who regularly helps the family) are gone by the time he returns or the marriage is over.

Mads orchestrates a plan that will force him to rethink his notions of being the head of a household. With the help of Mrs. Kryger, she persuades a reluctant Ida to go away for a while and rest while she sees to Viktor and the children. Then, she institutes a new regime, ordering Viktor to take over many of Ida's duties; Viktor obeys, cowed by his memories of the strict discipline she imposed on him when he was a child in her care. Meanwhile, Ida, no longer distracted by her many duties, feels the full misery of her situation and has a breakdown.

As time goes by, Viktor comes to fully appreciate his wife, and as he does love her dearly, longs for her return. When Ida, fully recovered, is allowed to come back, Viktor and the children are ecstatic. Ida's mother then shows him a newspaper advertisement offering an optometrist's shop for sale and gives him a check to buy it.

Cast
 Johannes Meyer as Viktor Frandsen
 Astrid Holm as Ida Frandsen
 Karin Nellemose as Karen Frandsen, their oldest child
 Mathilde Nielsen as Mads
 Clara Schønfeld as Alvilda Kryger
 Johannes Nielsen as Doctor
 Petrine Sonne as Laundress
 Aage Hoffman as Dreng, son
 Byril Harvig as Barnet, son
 Viggo Lindstrøm
 Aage Schmidt
 Vilhelm Petersen

Reception
The film has been evaluated as a "spare, compassionate, and astute social satire".

Home media
Master of the House was released to the Criterion Collection on Blu-ray and DVD.

References

External links
 
 
 
 
 Master of the House: In the Corner an essay by Mark Le Fanu at the Criterion Collection

1925 films
1925 drama films
Danish drama films
Danish silent films
Danish Culture Canon
Films directed by Carl Theodor Dreyer
Danish black-and-white films
Danish films based on plays
Silent drama films